Edmund (or Eadmund; died 1041) was Bishop of Durham from 1021 to 1041.

Symeon of Durham relates the story that Edmund was a monk of Durham Cathedral, and that he was chosen as bishop because a strange voice that came from the tomb of Saint Cuthbert insisted that Edmund be selected as the next bishop. His election was confirmed by King Cnut of England. Edmund died while visiting the English royal court at Gloucester in 1041.

Citations

References

External links
 

Bishops of Durham
11th-century English Roman Catholic bishops
1041 deaths
Year of birth unknown